Limnanthes macounii (Macoun's meadowfoam) is an endangered meadowfoam. It is a narrow endemic of south-western British Columbia, Canada. It was discovered in 1875 in the vicinity of the city of Victoria. Once thought to be extinct it was rediscovered in 1957 on Trial Island, BC and is now known from several scattered localities in southern British Columbia  It is a winter annual growing in seasonally wet areas.

Description
It is a small annual herb with divided leaves and inconspicuous white flowers.

References

External links
Limnanthes macounii - Botany Photo of the Day

Limnanthaceae
Flora of British Columbia
Endemic flora of Canada
Flora without expected TNC conservation status